Gustav Chrenka (4 July 1895 – 1 September 1974) was an Austrian footballer. He played in six matches for the Austria national football team from 1914 to 1924.

References

External links
 
 

1895 births
1974 deaths
Austrian footballers
Austria international footballers
Place of birth missing
Association football midfielders
Wiener AC players
First Vienna FC players